The 1957 FA Charity Shield was the 35th FA Charity Shield, an annual football match held between the winners of the previous season's Football League and FA Cup competitions. The match was contested by Manchester United, who had won the 1956–57 Football League, and Aston Villa, who had won the 1956–57 FA Cup, at Old Trafford, Manchester, on 22 October 1957. Manchester United won the match 4–0, with Tommy Taylor scoring a hat-trick and Johnny Berry adding a penalty.

Match details

See also
1956–57 Football League
1956–57 FA Cup

References

1957
Charity Shield 1957
Charity Shield 1957
Comm
Charity Shield